The rotund blind snake (Anilios pinguis) is a species of snake in the Typhlopidae family.

References

Anilios
Reptiles described in 1897
Snakes of Australia